This is an order of battle for the Battle of Tolentino that was fought on 2 May – 3 May 1815.

Austrian Army 

Commander-in-chief: Lieutenant Field Marshal Baron Bianchi

Total strength: 11,938 men – 1,452 horses – 28 guns

I Corps 

Commander: Lieutenant Field Marshal Baron 

General staff: Colonel Baron Fleischer, Major Kunerth, Captain Auer, Captain Muhlruer, Captain Potier

1st Brigade 

Commander: General Count Staheremberg

General staff: Captain Spanoghi, Lieutenant Moker
 
 Pioneers Company No. 1 "Radinski" (161 men)
 Tyrolean Jäger Battalion No. 9 (1,043 men)
 4¾ Squadrons, Hungarian Hussar Regiment No. 5 "Prince Regent of England" (441 men and horses)
 1 Battalion, Grenz Infantry Regiment No. 61 "Saint-Julien" (400 men)
 Artillery (6 guns, 102 men and 99 horses) 

Total: 2,147 men – 540 horses – 6 guns

2nd Brigade 

Commander: General Baron Senitzer

General Staff: General Staab, Major Startenthal, Captain Weingarten

 2 Battalions, Line Infantry Regiment No. 2 "Hiller" (1,971 men)
 2 Battalions, Line Infantry Regiment No. 43 "Simbschen" (1,848 men)
 1 Battalion, Grenz Infantry Regiment No. 62 "Wacquant-Geozelles" (969 men)
 Artillery (8 guns, 132 men and 70 horses) 

Total: 4,920 men – 70 horses – 8 guns

3rd Brigade 

Commander: General Baron Ekhardt

 3 Battalions, Line Infantry Regiment No. 3 "Archduke Charles" (2,426 men)
 2 Battalions, Line Infantry Regiment No. 27 "Chasteler" (1,490 men)
 Artillery (8 guns, 132 men and 70 horses) 

Total: 4,048 men – 70 horses – 8 guns

4th Brigade 

Commander: General Baron Taxis

 5½ Squadrons, Royal Tuscan Dragoon Regiment "Grand Duke Ferdinand" (726 men and horses)
 Artillery (6 guns, 97 men and 46 horses) 

Total: 823 men – 772 horses – 6 guns

Neapolitan Army 

Commander-in-chief: King Joachim Murat of Naples

General staff: General Prince Campana, General Costa, General De Medici, Captain Caselli

Total strength: 25,588 men – 4,790 horses – 58 guns

Guard Divisions 

Captain of the Guard: Lieutenant General Millet de Villeneuve

Infantry of the Guard 

Commander: General Prince Pignatelli Strongoli

 1st Velites Regiment (925 men) 
 2nd Velites Regiment (1,064 men)
 Voltigeurs  (1,236 men)
 2nd Artillery Regiment 540 men
 Artillery (10 guns, 126 men and 250 horses)
 Baggage Train (153 men)

Total: 4,044 men – 250 horses – 10 guns

Cavalry of the Guard 

Commander: General Livron

 Hussars of the Guard (426 men and 556 horses) 
 Mounted Chasseurs of the Guard (200 men and horses)
 Chevau-légers of the Guard (398 men and 447 horses)
 Lancers of the Guard (313 men and 340 horses)
 Artillery (8 guns, 106 men and 135 horses)
 Baggage Train (133 men)

Total: 1,576 men – 1,894 horses – 10 guns

2nd Infantry Division 

Commander: General Ambrosio

 3rd Light Infantry Regiment (2,203 men)
 2nd Line Infantry Regiment (2,096 men)
 6th Line Infantry Regiment (2,147 men)
 9th Line Infantry Regiment (1,438 men)
 Artillery (10 guns, 207 men and 210 horses)
 Baggage Train (138 men)

Total: 8,229 men – 210 horses – 10 guns

3rd Infantry Division 

Commander: General Lechi

 1st Light Infantry Regiment (2,060 men)
 4th Line Infantry Regiment (2,045 men)
 7th Line Infantry Regiment (1,843 men)
 8th Line Infantry Regiment (2,062 men)
 Artillery (10 guns, 205 men and 220 horses)
 Baggage Train (140 men)

Total: 8,010 men – 220 horses – 10 guns

4th Infantry Division 

Commander: General Pignatelli Cerchiara

 4th Light Infantry Regiment (800 men)
 10th, 11th and 12th Line Infantry Regiments (1,100 men)
 Cavalry Reserve (500 horses)

Total: 1,900 men – 500 horses

Cavalry Division 

Commander: General Rossetti

 1st Chevau-légers Regiment (242 men and 228 horses)
 2nd Chevau-légers Regiment (628 men and 592 horses)
 3rd Chevau-légers Regiment (563 men and 530 horses)
 4th Chevau-légers Regiment (416 men and 366 horses)

Total: 1,849 men – 1,716 horses

References 
Scheid, Frederick C. Appendix IV, Napoleon's Italian Campaigns: 1805-1815, Praeger/Greenwood (2002). 
Order of Battle at Tolentino 815

Tolentino